A green body is an object whose main constituent is weakly bound clay material, usually in the form of bonded powder or plates before it has been  sintered or  fired.

In ceramic engineering, the most common method for producing ceramic components is to form a green body comprising a mixture of the ceramic material and various organic or inorganic additives, and then to fire it in a kiln to produce a strong, vitrified object. Additives can serve as solvents, dispersants (deflocculants), binders, plasticizers, lubricants, or wetting agents. 

This method is used because of difficulties with the casting of ceramics — due to their extremely high melting temperature and viscosity (relative to other materials such as metals and polymers).

See also
 Compaction of ceramic powders
 Ceramic art
 Pottery
 Solid state chemistry

References

Ceramic materials